Stanley E. "Stan" Saylor (born March 3, 1953) is a Republican former member of the Pennsylvania House of Representatives for the 94th District and was first elected in 1992.  After the 2008 election, Saylor was elected the Republican Policy Committee Chairman. Following the 2010 election, he was elected Republican Whip and served in that role until 2015. He is also on the House Rules Committee. After his reelection in 2016, Saylor was named Chairman of the House Appropriations Committee. Saylor was defeated by Wendy Fink in the 2022 Republican primary election.

Election results
The 94th District from which Saylor is elected includes residents of Chanceford, Lower Chanceford, Lower Windsor, Peach Bottom, and Windsor Townships in the southeast portion of York County, their surrounded and adjacent boroughs, and five (the southernmost) of Springettsbury Township's eight local districts. He was unopposed in his reelection bids from 2000 until 2006, when Democrat Maxine Kuntz also ran for the seat; Saylor won with 73.5% of the vote. The results were very similar in 2008, when Democrat Deb Tillman received 26.8% of the vote to Saylor's 73.2%. Likewise in 2010, Democratic candidate Metta Barbour took 28.2% while Saylor had 71.8% voting for him. After no opposition in 2012, district voters gave Democrat David Colon 27.7% in 2014, to Saylor's 72.3%. Saylor had no challenger in 2016. In 2018, Democrat Stephen Snell received 33.6% of the vote, to Saylor's 66.4%. Saylor had no challenger again in 2020.

In 2022, Saylor was challenged in the Republican primary by Wendy Fink who ran an anti-establishment campaign. Fink defeated Saylor 55.7% to 44.3%.

Political positions
Saylor believes that legalizing adult-use cannabis in Pennsylvania is a "terrible idea", citing the federal legal status and calling it a "highly addictive drug".

Personal
Saylor graduated from Dallastown Area High School and majored in political science at Indiana University of Pennsylvania.  He resides in Windsor Township, Pennsylvania.

References

External links

Representative Saylor's official web site
Pennsylvania House profile

1955 births
21st-century American politicians
Living people
People from York County, Pennsylvania
Politicians from York, Pennsylvania
Republican Party members of the Pennsylvania House of Representatives